The 1987 Stanford Cardinal football team represented Stanford University in the 1987 NCAA Division I-A football season.

Schedule

Source:

Roster

References

Stanford
Stanford Cardinal football seasons
Stanford Cardinal football